Losing Sleep is the seventh solo album by the Scottish singer-songwriter Edwyn Collins, released 13 September 2010 on Heavenly Records.

The album was recorded at Collins' West Heath Studios and features guest appearances from Franz Ferdinand's Alex Kapranos and Nick McCarthy, Aztec Camera's Roddy Frame, Johnny Marr, The Cribs' Ryan Jarman and Jacob Graham, Connor Hanwick and Jonathan Pierce of The Drums.

It reached number 54 in the UK album charts upon its week of release; it is his most successful album since 1994's Gorgeous George and is Collins' return to rock-n-roll sound.

Track listing 
  "Losing Sleep" – 3:21
  "What Is My Role?" (feat. Ryan Jarman) – 4:20
  "Do It Again" (feat. Alex Kapranos and Nick McCarthy) – 3:12
  "Humble" – 3:22
  "Come Tomorrow, Come Today" (feat. Johnny Marr) – 2:58
  "Bored" – 4:25
  "In Your Eyes" (feat. The Drums) – 4:07
  "I Still Believe in You" (feat. Ryan Jarman) – 3:33
  "Over the Hill" – 3:35
  "It Dawns on Me" (feat. Romeo Stodart) – 3:53
  "All My Days" (feat. Roddy Frame) – 3:15
  "Searching for the Truth" – 2:18

Personnel 
Edwyn Collins – vocals, harmonica
Carwyn Ellis – guitar, bass, backing vocals, moog synthesizer, Univox keyboards, wurlitzer 
Paul Cook – drums
Barrie Cadogan – guitar, bass
Sean Read – saxophone, wurlitzer, vibraphone, backing vocals
Andy Hackett – guitar on track 4
Dave Ruffy – drums
Luca Santucci – backing vocals
Barbara Snow – trumpet 
Richard Sutton – saxophone

Production 
Producer: Edwyn Collins, Sebastian Lewsley
Engineer: Sebastian Lewsley
Mixing: Sebastian Lewsley, Edwyn Collins
Arranger: Edwyn Collins

Notes

Edwyn Collins albums
2010 albums
Heavenly Recordings albums
Albums produced by Edwyn Collins